John Jacob Riley (February 1, 1895 – January 1, 1962) was a U.S. Representative from South Carolina, husband of Corinne Boyd Riley.

Early life

Born on a farm near Orangeburg, South Carolina, Riley attended the public schools in Orangeburg County. His grandfather, Onan Beverly Riley (1844-1945), was a Confederate veteran. He graduated from Wofford College in Spartanburg, South Carolina, in 1915. Riley taught in the Orangeburg city schools 1915–1917, and at Clemson Agricultural and Mechanical College in 1917 and 1918.

During the First World War served in the United States Navy as a seaman, second class, and as a yeoman, third class, from 1918 to 1919. After the war, he engaged in the real estate and insurance business in Sumter, South Carolina from 1919 to 1945, and served as secretary of a building and loan association from 1923 to 1945.

Political career

Riley served as delegate to the Democratic State conventions from 1928 to 1944. He was elected as a Democrat to the Seventy-ninth and Eightieth Congresses (January 3, 1945 – January 3, 1949). He was an unsuccessful candidate for renomination in 1948, but won the nomination again in 1950.

Riley was elected to the Eighty-second and to the five succeeding Congresses and served from January 3, 1951, until his death at Surfside, near Myrtle Beach, South Carolina, January 1, 1962. Riley Park (Sumter) was named after him.
He was interred in Sumter Cemetery, Sumter, South Carolina.

He was a signatory to the 1956 Southern Manifesto that opposed the desegregation of public schools ordered by the Supreme Court in Brown v. Board of Education.

See also
 List of United States Congress members who died in office (1950–99)

Sources

External links 
 

1895 births
1962 deaths
Wofford College alumni
United States Navy sailors
Democratic Party members of the United States House of Representatives from South Carolina
20th-century American politicians
United States Navy personnel of World War I
American segregationists